Curtis Henry Bernard (February 18, 1878 – April 10, 1955) was an outfielder in Major League Baseball. He played for the New York Giants of the National League in 1900–1901.

External links

1878 births
1955 deaths
Major League Baseball outfielders
New York Giants (NL) players
Fall River Indians players
Brockton Shoemakers players
Taunton Herrings players
Albany Senators players
Toledo Mud Hens players
Los Angeles Angels (minor league) players
Vernon Tigers players
Newark Indians players
19th-century baseball players
Baseball players from West Virginia
Sportspeople from Parkersburg, West Virginia